FightBox is a game show that aired on BBC Three from 13 October to 10 November 2003 and is hosted by Lisa Snowdon and Trevor Nelson with Paul Dickenson as commentator.

Format
Contestants design their fighters and submit them to the BBC. Out of hundreds of submissions, only sixty were chosen to appear on the programme.

As well as battling each other, the fighters would face one of six "Sentients", warriors who had won previous (unseen) tournaments and achieved this honour. The Sentients were Banshi, Big George, Kodiak, Nail, Pearl and Vesuvius. Although immortal, they did have certain weaknesses which a fighter could use against them. After winning the first series, competitor warrior Kill Frenzy, created by Usman Arshad, achieved sentience and joined the current six. These seven Sentients featured in the video game mentioned below.

Six Games were played during the show these were: Conquest, Demolition, Duel, Helix, Panic and Revolution. Another game was Showdown, a straight one on one battle to determine the winner of each tournament.

Even though the show only lasted one season, a video game for the PlayStation 2, PC and Game Boy Advance was made, developed by the BBC's internal development division Gamezlab, who themselves created the software for the series.

References

External links

2003 British television series debuts
2003 British television series endings
BBC television game shows
2000s British game shows
English-language television shows
Sports entertainment
Television series by Warner Bros. Television Studios